"Thrift Shop" is a song written and performed by American hip hop duo Macklemore & Ryan Lewis featuring vocals from American singer Wanz, released on August 27, 2012, as the fourth single from the former's debut studio album, The Heist (2012). The lyrics show Macklemore's esteem for thrift shops and saving money, rather than flaunting expensive items like many rappers. The song was met with universal acclaim, with various music reviewers praising its humorous lyrics and social critique.

Despite being released on Macklemore's independent record label with distribution by the Alternative Distribution Alliance (ADA), a Warner Music Group company, the single was a sleeper hit. It reached number one on the US Billboard Hot 100 and has since sold over 6 million copies in the US alone. The song also reached number one in the United Kingdom, Ireland, Canada, France, Denmark, Netherlands, Australia and New Zealand. The song would go on to become the number one song of 2013 by Billboard and in 2019, it was named by Billboard as both the number one song of the 2010s on both the Hot Rap Songs and the Hot R&B/Hip-Hop Songs charts.

A music video was released simultaneously with the song on August 29, 2012, and has had more than 1.7 billion views on YouTube as of September 2022. At the 56th Annual Grammy Awards in 2014, the single won for Best Rap Performance and Best Rap Song.

Background and composition
The song illustrates Macklemore's interest in buying cheap clothing from thrift shops, disdaining designer labels and trends. He claims to enjoy donning "your granddad's clothes" and impulsively buying a sharp-looking but dubious-smelling fur stole just because "it was 99 cents". Macklemore spoke to MTV News about the meaning of the song. "Rappers talk about, oh I buy this and I buy that, and I spend this much money and I make it rain, and this type of champagne and painting the club, and this is the kind of record that's the exact opposite," he explained. "It's the polar opposite of it. It's kind of standing for like let's save some money, let's keep some money away, let's spend as little as possible and look as fresh as possible at the same time."

Asked why he thought the track was so successful, Macklemore replied, "I think hip-hop goes in waves, and it's something that's different. It's a concept. It's obviously against the status quo of what people normally rap about. This is a song that goes against all of that. How much can you save? How fresh can you look by not looking like anybody else? And on top of that, you have an infectious beat and a hook that gets stuck in people's heads."

"Thrift Shop" is written in the key of G minor and has a tempo of 95 beats per minute. The song is prominently underpinned by a looping saxophone melody.

Critical reception

The song received widespread critical acclaim. It has been called a critique of the product placement common in modern hip hop, but The New York Times critic Jon Caramanica wrote, "[I]t's not quite the robust sendup of hip-hop-extravagance clichés that it aspires to be." Robert Copsey of Digital Spy gave the song 5 out of 5 stars, calling it "a rare beast of a song - original, musically daring and genuinely funny." Entertainment Weekly named the song as the 18th best single of 2012. The song was number 1 in the Triple J Hottest 100 countdown of 2012. In 2022, American Songwriter named it Macklemore's best song.

Chart performance
In the United States, the song debuted on the Billboard Hot 100 on September 15, 2012. It dropped out the following week but re-entered six weeks later on October 20, 2012. The song then steadily climbed the chart until it entered the top ten in the issue dated January 5, 2013. It replaced Bruno Mars' "Locked Out of Heaven" at number one in its 16th week on the chart on February 2, 2013 and remained atop the chart for six non-consecutive weeks. It also topped the Rap Songs chart for fifteen weeks. It was the first song in the history of the Digital Songs chart to experience a jump in sales in each of its first five weeks atop the chart, "Thrift Shop" was the second best-selling single of 2013 in the US after Robin Thicke's "Blurred Lines", with 6,148,000 copies sold during the year. As of November 2015, the song has sold 7,740,000 downloads in the United States, making it the fifth all-time best-selling digital single in the country.

The song also had much success on Billboard's component charts, remaining atop the Digital Songs chart for ten weeks and topping Billboards Radio Songs chart for two weeks. It also peaked at number one on the On-Demand Songs chart and remained there for eleven weeks until week ending March 30, 2013. It set a record on that chart as the first song to reach two million streams in a single week since the chart's inception. The song also topped the R&B/Hip-Hop Songs chart for fourteen consecutive weeks. The song was the first independently distributed title to top the Billboard Digital Songs since "We Are the World 25 for Haiti" in February 2010. It was also only the second independent song to reach number one on the Billboard Hot 100 chart, nearly 20 years after Lisa Loeb's "Stay (I Missed You)" in 1994. Billboard ranked it as the No. 1 song for 2013.

In the United Kingdom, "Thrift Shop" entered the UK Singles Chart at number twenty four in late January 2013, despite having been available as a single via iTunes since August 1, 2012. The following week, the single rose twenty-two positions to number two. Two weeks after entering the chart, the song reached number one on February 10, 2013 ― for the week ending date February 16, 2013 ― making Macklemore and Ryan Lewis only the second act to have a number one in Britain with a self-released single. As of July 2013, "Thrift Shop" has sold 680,000 copies in the UK.

In Canada, the song topped the Canadian Hot 100 for six consecutive weeks. It was the country's second best-selling digital song of 2013 with 554,000 copies sold (all versions combined).

Wider reception
In August 2013, the rapper Le1f publicly criticized Macklemore's song on Twitter, claiming that "Thrift Shop" borrowed its beat extensively from his own earlier song, "Wut".

Some thrift shops have reported an increase in business, especially among college students, which they have attributed to the song. Several locations that were used in the music video and those that are located in the general vicinity of the places used for filming reported that their sales had not seen a sizable bump, but there was "attention."

Music video
The accompanying music video was co-directed by Jon Jon Augustavo, Macklemore and Ryan Lewis. It was released on Lewis' YouTube channel on August 29, 2012. Filming took place at several thrift shops in Seattle, including Goodwill Outlet, Value Village in Capitol Hill, Red Light Vintage and Fremont Vintage Mall, as well as at Seattle locations like the Unicorn/Narwhal Arcade Bar and the Northwest African American Museum. Macklemore attempted to persuade a fellow Seattle rapper, Sir Mix-a-Lot, to appear in the video but he did not return the calls. Some local Seattle musicians like Thomas Grey of Champagne Champagne appear in the music video, and a DeLorean is shown as well. The video was nominated at the 2013 MTV Video Music Awards for Video of the Year.

In popular culture

Parodies
The children's show Sesame Street makes a parody of "Thrift Shop" in which Macklemore appeared playing the character "Mucklemore", shows Oscar the Grouch and his other Grouches the proper way to recycle their trash.

A parody was a part of a Pessach Shop Passover Jam, done for the Jewish holiday of Passover by the a cappella group Six13.

The American comedy artist Rucka Rucka Ali parodied the song twice in his album Black Man of Steal. One of his parodies is titled "I'm Obama", the other, "I'm Osama".

Verizon Wireless parodied the song in a 2016 holiday promotion, this time in a laundromat.

Media
The song was also used in the trailers for the films Pain & Gain, The Internship and Tammy.

"Weird Al" Yankovic recorded a cover version of "Thrift Shop" as part of his polka medley "NOW That's What I Call Polka!" for his 2014 album Mandatory Fun.

In 2018, a slightly modified version of the original song was also used for Suncorp advertisements featuring their mascot, Sunny.

Formats and track listings

Credits and personnel
 Ryan Lewis – production
 Macklemore – vocals, writing
 DV One – scratches
 Brooklyn Grinnell – vocals
 Wanz – vocals

Charts

Weekly charts

Year-end charts

Decade-end charts

All-time charts

Certifications

See also 
 List of Airplay 100 number ones of the 2010s
 Whatever You Like ("Weird Al" Yankovic song), a similarly themed song from 2008
 List of best-selling singles
 List of best-selling singles in Australia
 List of best-selling singles in the United States
 List of Hot 100 number-one singles of the 2010s (U.S.)

References

Macklemore songs
Ryan Lewis songs
2012 singles
Number-one singles in Australia
Number-one singles in Denmark
Number-one singles in Finland
SNEP Top Singles number-one singles
Number-one singles in Israel
Number-one singles in Lebanon
Number-one singles in New Zealand
Number-one singles in Norway
Number-one singles in Romania
Number-one singles in Scotland
UK Singles Chart number-one singles
Irish Singles Chart number-one singles
Billboard Hot 100 number-one singles
Canadian Hot 100 number-one singles
2012 songs
Songs written by Macklemore
Songs written by Ryan Lewis
Grammy Award for Best Rap Performance
Songs about consumerism
Pop-rap songs
Comedy rap songs
Songs involved in plagiarism controversies